Emmanuel's Evangelical Lutheran Church is a historic Lutheran church at 30 W. Warren Street in Germantown, Ohio. The Gothic Revival church building was constructed in 1867 for a congregation that formed in 1809. The congregation had originally shared a building with the local German Reformed congregation; when this arrangement proved inadequate in the 1830s, it built its own brick building, which was reconstructed into the 1867 building. It is one of four extant churches in the area built by Pennsylvania German settlers in the nineteenth century. The church's design features a gable front entrance split into three sections, each with an arched doorway and large arched stained glass window; the central section is topped by a tall multi-faced steeple.

The church was added to the National Register of Historic Places on September 6, 1990.

References

External links

Official website

Lutheran churches in Ohio
Churches on the National Register of Historic Places in Ohio
Gothic Revival church buildings in Ohio
Churches completed in 1867
Churches in Montgomery County, Ohio
National Register of Historic Places in Montgomery County, Ohio
Pennsylvania Dutch culture in Ohio
Germantown, Ohio